What Comes Naturally is the tenth studio album by Scottish-born singer Sheena Easton, released in 1991 through MCA Records. This album includes Easton’s final US Top 20 hit to date, "What Comes Naturally", which remained on the pop chart for 10 weeks. The single reached number 4 in Australia, where the album also made the top 40. Other singles released were "You Can Swing It" and "To Anyone", both which failed to chart.  The album charted in the United States at number 90. Easton is the co-writer on three tracks on the album.

What Comes Naturally (Expanded Edition) was released to digital streaming format on Apple Music and Spotify on August 16, 2021.

Background
Like her previous release, the 1988, "The Lover in Me", Easton's management sought to make the Scottish singer's image more accessible to a younger market.  The artwork for the album cover to "What Comes Naturally", done by John Coulte, features the singer in a solid black leotard and thigh high boots straddling a chair.  According to Mr. Coulte in a January 1991 interview with New York City based Reader's Digest, "We were going for a sort of tramped up ballerina who moonlights as either a casino craps dealer or a New Jersey hairdresser with a gambling addiction.  We struggled with props, ultimately going with a toddler's high chair over an infant's seesaw."

Track listing

Charts

Production and personnel
 Track 1 arranged by Nick Mundy. Produced by Nick Mundy and Denny Diante. Recorded by Robert Rochelle and Steve Harrison, with assistance by Marnie Riley. Mixed by Jon Gass.  Joey Diggs and Sheena Easton: backing vocals; Nick Mundy: keyboards, synthesizers, drum programming, backing vocals; Gina Go-Go: rap
 Track 2 arranged by Ron Spearman and Vassal Benford. Produced by Vassal Benford. Recorded by Neal Pogue, with assistance by Shawn Berman. Mixed by Peter Arata. Angela Dauphiney, Antoinette Brown, Charlene White, Mildred Black, Sheena Easton, Valerie Davis: backing vocals; Vassal Benford: all instruments, programming.
 Track 3 arranged and produced by Wolf & Epic. Recorded by Dave "Hard Drive" Pensado, with assistance by Greg Barrett and Steve Egelman. Mixed by Frank Wolf and Gil Morales. Colin England, Delisa Davis and Sheena Easton: backing vocals; Richard Wolf: guitars, keyboards, backing vocals; Bret Mazur: drums, percussion, programming.
 Tracks 4, 7 & 8 arranged and produced by Ian Prince. Project Coordination on Track 7: Laura Harding. Recorded and mixed by Ted Blaisdell, with recording assistance by Daryl Dobson.  Sheena Easton: backing vocals; Alex Brown and Phil Perry: backing vocals on Track 7; Ian Prince: keyboards, synthesizers, synthesizer programming, drum programming, percussion, backing vocals on Track 8; Steve Milo: additional synth programming; Robert Palmer: guitars on Track 7.
 Track 5 arranged and produced by Oliver Leiber and Jeff Lorber. Recorded by Jeff Lorber and Gabriel Moffat, with assistance by Wolfgang Aichholz. Mixed by Alan Meyerson, with assistance by John Chamberlin. Carmen Twillie, Maxine Waters, Monalisa Young and Terry Young: backing vocals; Sheena Easton: additional backing vocals; Jeff Lorber and Oliver Leiber: guitars, keyboards, synthesizers, drum programming.  
 Tracks 6 & 9 arranged and produced by David Frank. Track 6 recorded by Dave Dachinger, Doug Deangelis, Michael O'Reilly and Paul McKenna. Mixed by Ray Bardani. Track 9 recorded by Peter Arata, with recording assistance by Wolfgang Aichholz and mix assistance by John Chamberlin. Martin Brammer: Track 9 "Mix Advisor".  B.J. Nelson and Debbe Cole: backing vocals (Track 6); Sheena Easton: backing vocals (Track 9); David Frank: keyboards; Paul Pesco: guitars (Track 6); Will Lee: bass (Track 6); Jimmy Bralower: drums, percussion (Track 6).
 Track 10 arranged and produced by Oliver Leiber. Recorded by Jeff Lorber (Vocoder), Greg Grill, Peter Martinsen and Steven Harrison. Mixed by Jon Gass, with assistance by Donnell Sullivan. Monalisa Young, Portia Griffin, Valerie Pinkston-Mayo: backing vocals;  Oliver Leiber: guitars, keyboards, drum programming; Paul "St. Paul" Peterson: keyboards, electric bass.
 Track 11 arranged by Rich Tancredi and Ric Wake. Produced by Ric Wake. Production Coordination: David Barrett. Recorded and mixed by Bob Cadway, with recording assistance by Dan Hetzel and Tom Yezzi.  Remixed by David Leonard. The Waters Sisters: backing vocals; Rich Tancredi: keyboards; Joey Franco: drums, percussion.

Additional credits
 Lead vocals: Sheena Easton
 Art Direction and Design: John Coulter
 Logo: Margo Chase
 Cover Photo: Randee St. Nicholas
 Other Photos: Alberto Tolot
 Management: Harriet Wasserman
 Management Assistant: Joey Kennedy
 Hair: Barron Matalon
 Make-up: Francesca Tolot
 Stylist: Elizabeth Keiselbach

References

1991 albums
Sheena Easton albums
New jack swing albums
MCA Records albums